A Murder Beside Yanhe River is a 2014 Chinese historical film directed by Wang Fangfang, starring Cheng Taishen, Wang Kai, Ma Weiwei, Huang Haibing, Dai Jiang, and Mao Hai. It is based on the murder case of Huang Kegong, who was a general of the Chinese Workers' and Peasants' Red Army. The film premiered in China at the Great Hall of the People on 1 December 2014.

Cast

Main cast
 Cheng Taishen as Lei Jingtian, a general of the Chinese Workers' and Peasants' Red Army, the chief judge.
 Wang Kai as Huang Kegong, a general of the Chinese Workers' and Peasants' Red Army, he shot and killed a college girl who named "Liu Qian".
 Ma Weiwei as Liu Qian, a college girl come from Taiyuan, capital of Shanxi province.
 Huang Haibing as Mao Zedong, the leader of the Chinese Workers' and Peasants' Red Army.
 Dai Jiang as He Zizhen, Mao's wife.
 Mao Hai as Hu Yaobang
 Yang Jiayin as Li Xingguo.
 Zhang Jie as Zhang Wentian, 5th General Secretary of the Central Committee of the Communist Party of China.
Sally Victoria Benson as Anna, Russian KGB Journalist

Other
 Cai Yida as Sun Qiguang.
 Li Dachuan as Yuan Ping.
 Wang Xuran as a guard.

Released
On October 23, 2014, the press conference was held at the 1st Silk Road International Festival in Shanghai.

The film premiered in China on December 1, 2014 and it was given a wider release on December 4, 2014.

References

External links
 
 
 

Films shot in Shaanxi
Films set in Shaanxi
2014 films
Chinese historical films
2010s historical films
Films based on actual events
2010s Mandarin-language films